The Standing Senate Committee on Transport and Communications (TRCM) is one of the oldest standing committees of the Senate of Canada, having been first created in 1867 under the name of the Banking, Commerce and Railways Committee.  In 1945, it was recommended that a committee on Transport and Communications be created.

Responsibilities
Over the years, the mandate has evolved, but subject areas for which the Committee is responsible include:
Transport and communications by land, air, water, and space, be this by radio, telephone, telegraph, wire, cable, microwave, wireless, television, satellite, broadcasting, post, or any other means, method or form.
Tourist traffic.
Common carriers; and
Navigation, shipping and navigable waters.

Members 

The Representative of the Government in the Senate and Leader of the Opposition in the Senate are both ex-officio members of the committee.

References
 

Committees of the Senate of Canada